State Assembly is the name given to various legislatures, especially lower houses or full legislatures in states in federal systems of government.

Channel Islands
States Assembly is the name of the legislature of the Bailiwick of Jersey. The Bailiwick of Guernsey has a similar assembly named the States of Deliberation.

United States 
Examples include:
California State Assembly
New York State Assembly
Wisconsin State Assembly

Russia
 State Assembly of the Republic of Bashkortostan
 State Assembly of the Mari El Republic
 State Assembly of the Republic of Mordovia
 State Assembly of the Altai Republic
 State Assembly of the Republic of Adygea
 State Assembly of the Republic of Bashkortostan
 State Assembly of the Sakha Republic

Other states 
 State Assembly of Kedah, Malaysia

See also

Legislatures